Alwyn Crendall Cashe (July 13, 1970 – November 8, 2005) was a United States Army senior non-commissioned officer who was posthumously awarded the Medal of Honor for heroism in Iraq. On November 10, 2020, the United States Congress voted to upgrade Cashe's initially awarded Silver Star to the Medal of Honor. On December 16, 2021, more than 16 years after his death at age 35, Cashe's widow, Tamara,  accepted the Medal of Honor from President Joe Biden at a ceremony commemorating the actions of Cashe and two fellow soldiers for their acts in separate battles.

Early life and education
Cashe was born in Sanford, Florida, on July 13, 1970.  He was raised in Oviedo, Florida, and attended Oviedo High School, graduating in 1988.

Career 
Cashe enlisted in the U.S. Army following high school graduation in 1988.  As an infantryman, he deployed in support of the 1991 Gulf War. He also deployed to former Yugoslavia, earning the Kosovo Campaign Medal. Prior to his assignment to 3rd Infantry Division, he deployed once again to Iraq in support of Operation Iraqi Freedom following the 2003 invasion. 

During his time in service he also served as a drill sergeant.

On the evening of October 17, 2005, Cashe, a member of A Company, 1st Battalion, 15th Infantry Regiment, 3rd Infantry Division, managed to save the lives of six of his fellow soldiers after the Bradley fighting vehicle they were riding in struck an improvised explosive device despite suffering second and third-degree burns over 72% of his body.  Cashe succumbed to his injuries on November 8, 2005, at Brooke Army Medical Center, Fort Sam Houston, Texas. Cashe is interred at Restlawn Cemetery in Sanford, Florida.

Legacy
On July 19, 2014, a new Army Reserve center in Sanford, Florida was named in Cashe's honor.
On May 11, 2019, the Oviedo Post Office was renamed in Cashe's honor.

On July 23, 2020, Alwyn Cashe's son, Andrew Cashe, graduated One Station Unit Training (OSUT) for Infantry soldiers at Fort Benning, Georgia.

On May 20, 2021, 3rd Infantry Division at Fort Stewart, GA renamed their primary ceremonial grounds from “Marne Gardens” to “Cashe Gardens”. Located next to the Division Headquarters, Cashe Gardens is utilized by the installation for Battalion, Brigade, and Division Changes of Command as well as other high-profile ceremonies.

Campaign to upgrade Cashe's Silver Star to the Medal of Honor 
Gary Brito, Cashe's battalion commander at the time of the action, did not initially realize the extent of Cashe's injuries and the pain he must have been in when he nominated Cashe for the Silver Star award.  Witnesses were evacuated for medical treatment and unavailable for statement.  Brito subsequently submitted additional statements to the Army to justify upgrading Cashe's award to the Medal of Honor.  Brito continued to support efforts to upgrade Cashe's Silver Star to the Medal of Honor

On October 17, 2019, the 14th anniversary of Cashe's actions, three members of Congress wrote to Defense Secretary Mark Esper and Army Secretary Ryan McCarthy formally requesting an upgrade of Cashe's award to the Medal of Honor.  The letter was authored by retired Navy SEAL Dan Crenshaw, former Special Forces officer Michael Waltz and Stephanie Murphy.

On August 24, 2020, Secretary of Defense, Mark Esper, agreed that Cashe's actions merited award of the Medal of Honor.
On September 22, 2020, the U.S. House of Representatives unanimously passed a bill, introduced by Rep. Stephanie Murphy (D-FL), which allowed Cashe to finally receive the Medal of Honor.  HR 8276 waived a five-year time statute of limitations that expired for normal consideration for Medal of Honor awards by directly authorizing the President to award the medal “for acts of valor during Operation Iraqi Freedom.”

On September 28, 2020, Pittsburgh Steelers left tackle Alejandro Villanueva, a former US Army ranger, taped Cashe's name on the back of his helmet, covering the name of Antwon Rose Jr, who was killed by an East Pittsburgh policeman in June 2018. The team had previously decided to honor Rose.  Villanueva stated his actions were intended to support the campaign to award Cashe the Medal of Honor.

On November 10, 2020, the Senate passed legislation that cleared the way for Cashe to be awarded the Medal of Honor.

On December 4, 2020, President Donald Trump signed H.R. 8276, which authorized the President to posthumously award the Medal of Honor to Alwyn C. Cashe.

Awarding of the Medal of Honor 
The awarding of Cashe's Medal of Honor to his family was delayed by the new administration. It was hoped by members of Cashe's family and several U.S. House Representatives that the award ceremony would take place as fast as possible. However, on January 11, 2021, it was announced that it was now expected to happen after President Biden assumed office on January 20.
President Biden awarded three Medals of Honor, to Cashe's family, Earl Plumlee and the family of Christopher Celiz, in a ceremony on December 16, 2021.

Awards and decorations

Silver Star

Medal of Honor

Commendations
SFC Cashe's awards include:

References

External links 

 US Army Medal of Honor Archived
 Medal of Honor presented Archived

1970 births
2005 deaths
United States Army Medal of Honor recipients
United States Army non-commissioned officers
United States Army personnel of the Gulf War
United States Army personnel of the Iraq War
American military personnel killed in the Iraq War
African-American United States Army personnel
Military personnel from Florida
People from Oviedo, Florida
People from Sanford, Florida